The following is a List of awards and nominations received by Alan Cumming .

Major associations

BAFTA Awards

Emmy Awards

Golden Globe Awards

Laurence Olivier Awards

Screen Actors Guild Awards

Tony Awards

Audio awards

Film awards

Festivals

Television awards

Theatre awards

Other

Notes

References

External links
 Official website

Lists of awards received by British actor